Haría may refer to:
Haría (municipality), on the island of Lanzarote in the Canary Islands
Haría (village), on the island of Lanzarote in the Canary Islands
Haria, Saparua, a village in Indonesia